The Great Western Garment Company (GWG) was a Canadian denim and western wear clothing company founded in 1911 in Edmonton, Alberta by  Charles A. Graham and Alexander Cameron Rutherford (the first Premier of Alberta).

The company's slogan of "They wear longer because they're made stronger" suggests the clothing's intended market: farmers and working-class people. The company also appealed to a working class demographic with their affordable pricing, usually 2/3 the price of red-tab Levi's jeans.

GWG provided clothing for the war effort during both World Wars. During World War II, GWG produced up to 100,000 pieces of military clothing per month for the Canadian and Allied armed forces, making it the largest clothing manufacturer in the British Commonwealth.

During the 1950s, GWG's Donald Freeland developed the stone washed technique for its products, increasing the softness and flexibility of the rigid denim fabric. By the 1970s, the denim and textiles industry had fully adopted the stone-washing technique, helping to bring denim to a larger and more versatile market.

In 1961, Levi Strauss acquired 75 percent of GWG, expanding these holdings to 100 percent in 1972, at a time when GWG held roughly 30 percent of the Canadian jeanswear market.

Market share for the workman like quality of GWG jeans fell as designer label and fashion oriented jeans grew in popularity. By the early 1990s, the GWG brand held less than 5 percent of the Canadian market. The same conditions were impacting the market share for the Levi brand, leading to Levi Strauss closing a number of factories worldwide and taking direct control of the operations of GWG in 2002. Attempts to make the GWG brand profitable again were not successful, and the Edmonton GWG factory, along with all remaining Levi Strauss factories in North America, closed in 2004.

References

Clothing companies of Canada
Defunct textile companies of Canada
Jeans by brand
Companies based in Edmonton
Clothing companies established in 1911
Manufacturing companies disestablished in 2004